Meri Saheli Meri Bhabi is a Pakistani drama soap that first aired on Geo Tv on 6 July 2016 (first day of Eid). It is produced by Babar Javed. It is on air every Monday to Friday at 7:30pm only on Geo Tv.The last episode aired on 24 May. The total number of Episodes was 231. The show also re-run on Geo Kahani under the title of Bhabi Saath Nibhana.

Series overview

Cast

Aleezay Tahir as Fareeha
Rida Isfahani/Amna Malik as Mehreen
Hafsa Butt as Aiza
Ikram Abbasi as Aryan
Shahid Naqvi
Shazia Gohar as Begum Agha
Ali Ansari as Hammad 
Adil Wadia
Fareeha Jabeen as Salma
Syed Ali Hasan as Saarim
Parveen Akbar as Shabana
Neelam Gul
Umar Hussnain 
Yashma Gill as Mooni
Ramsha Khan as Sara
Rohail Khan as Fawad

See also
 Geo TV
 List of Pakistani television series
 List of programs broadcast by Geo Entertainment

References

External links

 
A&B Entertainment
2016 Pakistani television series debuts